Following is an incomplete list of past and present Members of Parliament (MPs) of the United Kingdom whose surnames begin with M.  The dates in parentheses are the periods for which they were MPs.

John McAllion
Tommy McAvoy
Steve McCabe
Christine McCafferty
Ian McCartney
Siobhain McDonagh
Alan Mak
Calum MacDonald
Malcolm MacDonald
Ramsay MacDonald
John McDonnell
John MacDougall
John McFall
John MacGregor
Anne McGuire
Shona McIsaac
Frederick Coleridge Mackarness
Andrew MacKay
Ann McKechin
Rosemary McKenna
Halford Mackinder
Andrew Mackinlay
John Scott Maclay, 1st Viscount Muirshiel
David Maclean
Donald Maclean
Fitzroy Maclean
Kenneth Marks
Neil Maclean
Henry McLeish
Robert Maclennan, Baron Maclennan of Rogart
Iain Macleod
Frank McManus
Gordon McMaster
Maurice Macmillan
Kevin McNamara
Angus MacNeil
Tony McNulty
Denis MacShane
Fiona Mactaggart
Tony McWalter
John McWilliam
Diana Maddock
David Madel
Bryan Magee
Ken Maginnis
Frank Maguire
Khalid Mahmood
Alice Mahon
Anne Main
John Major
Ian Malcolm
Shahid Malik
Humfrey Malins
Judy Mallaber
Seamus Mallon
Cecil L'Estrange Malone
John Mann
Leah Manning
Reginald Manningham-Buller, 1st Viscount Dilhorne
John Maples
John Marek
David Margesson, 1st Viscount Margesson
Ernest Marples
Rob Marris
Gordon Marsden
Paul Marsden
Arthur Harold Marshall (1910–1918), (1922–1923)
David Marshall
Jim Marshall
Bob Marshall-Andrews
Michael Martin
Eric Martlew
Glyn Mason, 2nd Baron Blackford
Roy Mason
Charles Masterman
Michael Mates
Matthew Decker
Angus Maude
Francis Maude
Reginald Maudling
Sir Thomas Mauleverer, 1st Baronet 
Brian Mawhinney
James Maxton
John Maxton, Baron Maxton
David Maxwell Fyfe, 1st Earl of Kilmuir
Robert Maxwell
Theresa May (1997–present)
Christopher Mayhew
Patrick Mayhew
Joan Maynard
Kerry McCarthy
Sarah McCarthy-Fry
Robert McCartney
William McCrea
Alasdair McDonnell
Pat McFadden
Jim McGovern
Eddie McGrady
Martin McGuinness
Anne McIntosh
Reginald McKenna
Anne McLaughlin
Patrick McLoughlin
Michael McNair-Wilson
Hector McNeil
Ronald McNeill, 1st Baron Cushendun
Thomas McNally, Baron McNally
Esther McVey
Michael Meacher
Alan Meale
David Mellor
Patrick Mercer
Piers Merchant
Gillian Merron
Philip Metcalfe (1784–1802)
Sir Anthony Meyer, 3rd Baronet (1964–1966), (1970–1992)
Alun Michael (1987–2012)
Bill Michie
Ray Michie
Ian Mikardo
Alan Milburn
Charles William Miles (1882–1885)
John William Miles (1868)
Philip John Miles (1820–1826),  (1829–1832), (1835–1837)
Sir Philip Miles, 2nd Baronet (1878–1885)
Philip William Skinner Miles (1837–1852)
Sir William Miles, 1st Baronet (1818–1820), (1830–1832), (1834–1865)
David Miliband (2001–present)
Ed Miliband (2005–present)
Bruce Millan
Andrew Miller
Maria Miller
Stephen Milligan
Ernest Millington
James Milner, 1st Baron Milner of Leeds
Anne Milton
Andrew Mitchell
Austin Mitchell
William Mitchell-Thomson, 1st Baron Selsdon
Anne Moffat
Laura Moffatt
Chris Mole
James Molyneaux
Walter Monckton, 1st Viscount Monckton of Brenchley
Hector Monro, Baron Monro of Langholm, (1964–1997)
Edwin Samuel Montagu
Samuel Montagu, 1st Baron Swaythling
Fergus Montgomery
Madeleine Moon
Lewis Moonie
John Moore, Baron Moore of Lower Marsh
Michael Moore
Newton Moore
John Cuthbert Moore-Brabazon, 1st Baron Brabazon of Tara
Margaret Moran
Jessica Morden
E. D. Morel
Alasdair Morgan
Julie Morgan
Rhodri Morgan
William Morice
Elliot Morley
John Morley, 1st Viscount Morley of Blackburn
Charles Morris
Estelle Morris
John Morris
Michael Morris, Baron Naseby
Herbert Morrison
William Morrison, 1st Viscount Dunrossil
Oswald Mosley
Malcolm Moss
William Arthur Mount, 1st Baronet
William George Mount
Kali Mountford
Mo Mowlam
George Mudie
H. T. Muggeridge
Greg Mulholland
Frederick Mulley
Chris Mullin
David Mundell
Meg Munn
Tessa Munt
Conor Murphy
Denis Murphy
Jim Murphy
Paul Murphy
Andrew Murrison
Ian Murray
James Murray, 1st Baron Glenlyon

 M